Mallennium is the 4th studio album by rapper Mac Mall. It was released June 22, 1999.

Track listing

1999 albums
Mac Mall albums